2nd Banino or Vtoroye Banino is a rural locality in Baninsky Selsoviet Rural Settlement, Fatezhsky District, Kursk Oblast, Russia. Population:

Geography 
The village is located on the Gnilovodchik River (a link tributary of the Usozha in the basin of the Svapa), 110 km from the Russia–Ukraine border, 47 km north-west of Kursk, 6.5 km (16 km by road) north-east of the district center – the town Fatezh, 6 km from the selsoviet center – Chermoshnoy. There are no streets with titles.

 Climate
2nd Banino has a warm-summer humid continental climate (Dfb in the Köppen climate classification).

Transport 
2nd Banino is located 6.5 km from the federal route  Crimea Highway as part of the European route E105, 7 km from the road of regional importance  (Fatezh – Dmitriyev), 0.5 km from the road of intermunicipal significance  (M2 "Crimea Highway" – 1st Banino), 24 km from the nearest railway station Vozy (railway line Oryol – Kursk).

The rural locality is situated 48 km from Kursk Vostochny Airport, 170 km from Belgorod International Airport and 229 km from Voronezh Peter the Great Airport.

References

Notes

Sources

Rural localities in Fatezhsky District